Mason County Airport  is a public use airport in Mason County, West Virginia, United States. It is owned by the Mason County Commission and located four nautical miles (5 mi, 7 km) northeast of the central business district of Point Pleasant, West Virginia. This airport is included in the National Plan of Integrated Airport Systems for 2011–2015, which categorized it as a general aviation facility.

Facilities and aircraft 
Mason County Airport covers an area of 124 acres (50 ha) at an elevation of 643 feet (196 m) above mean sea level. It has one runway designated 7/25 with an asphalt surface measuring 4,000 by 75 feet (1,219 x 23 m).

For the 12-month period ending July 1, 2012, the airport had 1,810 aircraft operations, an average of 150 per month: 93.9% general aviation, 5.5% air taxi, and 0.6% military. At that time there were nine aircraft based at this airport: 56% single-engine, 22% ultralight, 11% multi-engine, and 11% helicopter.

References

External links 
 Aerial image as of April 1988 from USGS The National Map
 
 

Airports in West Virginia
Transportation in Mason County, West Virginia